The Kayah State Democratic Party (KySDP) is a political party in Myanmar seeking to represent the interests of the Karenni people.

The KySDP ran 30 candidates in the 2020 general election and won eight seats.

References

External links 
 

Political parties in Myanmar
Political parties established in 2017
2017 establishments in Myanmar